The Hitchcock Ichnological Cabinet is a collection of fossil footmarks assembled between 1836 and 1865 by Edward Hitchcock (1793–1864), noted American geologist, state geologist of Massachusetts, United States, and President of Amherst College. He was one of the first experts in fossil tracks. A footmark impression in stone is a petrosomatoglyph.

Begun when the science of ichnology (the study of tracks) was in its infancy, and the word dinosaur had not been coined yet, the collection was made chiefly from the fossils of the Connecticut River Valley (Connecticut River Valley trackways). By 1875 this collection consisted of 21,773 tracks representing 120 species. It is the world's largest collection of dinosaur tracks.

Starting in 1855, the collection was located in the lower level of Appleton Cabinet on the Amherst College campus. It has subsequently been twice relocated, and can now be found in the Amherst College Museum of Natural History.

See also 
 Amherst College Museum of Natural History
 Connecticut River Valley trackways
 Dinosaur State Park

References

Further reading 
 E. Hitchcock, "An attempt to discriminate and describe the animals that made the fossil footmarks of the United States, and especially of New England", American Academy of Arts & Sciences Memoir, 3:129–256. 1848.
 E. Hitchcock, Ichnology of New England: A report on the sandstone of the Connecticut Valley, especially its fossil footmarks, Commonwealth of Massachusetts, 220 pp. 1858.
 E. Hitchcock, Supplement to the Ichnology of New England, Commonwealth of Massachusetts, 96 pp. 1865.
 C. H. Hitchcock, A synopsis of the genera and species of the Lithichnozoa in the Hitchcock Ichnological Museum of Amherst College, unpublished document, Pratt Museum of Natural History, Amherst College, 1859.

External links 
 Emma C. Rainforth, researcher on Hitchcock collection
 The Edward Hitchcock Virtual Ichnological Cabinet
 Beneski Museum of Natural History

1865 establishments in Massachusetts
Amherst College
Trace fossils
Collections of museums in the United States